Robert Edmondson may refer to:

 Robert Edward Edmondson (1872–1959), anti-Jewish pamphleteer
 Robert W. Edmondson, Metropolitan Archbishop of the Anglo-Lutheran Catholic Church